A treadmill is an exercise machine for running or walking while staying in one place

Treadmill or treadmilling may also refer to:

Devices
Hamster treadmill, a wheel found in a rodent's cage
Omnidirectional treadmill, a device that allows a person to perform locomotive motion in any direction
Penal treadmill, a treadmill that was used to extract labor from prisoners in Victorian prisons

Science
Euphemism treadmill, in sociolinguistics the tendency for euphemisms to become dysphemisms
Hedonic treadmill, in positive psychology the tendency of a person to remain at a relatively stable level of happiness despite changes in fortune or the achievement of major goals
Treadmilling, in molecular biology a phenomenon observed in many cellular cytoskeletal filaments

Places
Treadmill Ridge, a mountain located on the border of Alberta and British Columbia

Fiction
Cosmic treadmill, a fictional time travel device in the DC Comics universe

See also
 Readmill, an ereader app available February 2011-July 2014
Treadwheel